Merciful Release is a record label started by Andrew Eldritch, frontman with Leeds band the Sisters of Mercy. As Eldritch stated in an early interview, he wanted to hear himself on the radio. He and Gary Marx (Mark Pairman) played and recorded on the Sisters of Mercy's initial single "Damage Done" and pressed one thousand copies. This record was something of a collector's item.

Throughout the early 1980s, the band released several singles on Merciful Release, controlling the format and image of the records, typically in a black sleeve with artwork centrally mounted and a head and star logo on the rear of sleeves. A notable example of this being Henri Matisse's Blue Nude in gold on black for the single Alice.

By 1984, the band had signed a distribution deal with Warner Bros. Records (Elektra in the US) whilst still maintaining control of Merciful Release.

In the 1990s, a number of CDs were released on the Merciful Release label for the MK Ultra: their Beluga Pop and This Is This albums, and German band Scoda Blush.

List of releases

See also
 List of record labels

British record labels
The Sisters of Mercy
Goth record labels
Vanity record labels